Ignacio Alberto Piatti (born 4 February 1985) is an Argentine former professional footballer who played as a winger.

Club career
Piatti has played professional football in Europe with Saint-Étienne and Lecce. In his native Argentina, he has played for Chacarita Juniors, Gimnasia LP, and Independiente.

On 17 August 2012 Piatti signed for the Argentine club San Lorenzo de Almagro for a reported fee of €1 million. He debuted against Colon de Santa Fe in the sixth match of Torneo Inicial 2012, Ignacio was the player of the match.

On 2 July 2014, Piatti signed a transfer agreement with Canadian club Montreal Impact of Major League Soccer. However, he remained with San Lorenzo until the team completed their Copa Libertadores campaign. He reported to Montreal on 13 August 2014, and debuted for Montreal against the Chicago Fire on 16 August. When Piatti joined the Impact, he was an instantaneous success, scoring 4 goals in 6 games. He started all six games in the 2014–15 CONCACAF Champions League Championship Stage and helped the team reach the final, where they lost out against Mexican giants Club América, recording two goals and one assist in 526 minutes played. He also helped the team reach the Eastern Conference Final of the 2016 MLS Cup Playoffs. He and the club mutually agreed to terminate the contract on 10 February 2020, allowing him to sign a new contract with first division Argentine club San Lorenzo. At the time of his departure, Piatti was the all-time top goalscorer of the Montreal Impact, with 78 goals in all competitions, and the second all-time assist leader. Piatti also ranked first in Impact club history with 130 regular-season starts, 66 MLS goals, 11,427 minutes played, 35 assists, 15 penalty goals, 15 game-winning goals, 13 game-winning assists, and 14 multi-goal games. He also registered five goals and three assists in eight starts in the MLS Cup playoffs during his time with the club.

Style of play
A dynamic attacker, Piatti is a technically skilled dribbler, who is capable of both creating and scoring goals, and is able to play in several midfield roles. Although he is capable of playing in the centre, behind another striker, he usually plays on the left wing, which is his favorite position, as it enables him to cut into the centre and shoot on goal with his stronger right foot; regarding his preference for this position, he has stated, "I played on the left for a long time, in Argentina, for example...I’d rather play on the left. I’m comfortable there." Although he is usually deployed in midfield, Piatti has also been fielded in several more offensive roles, and has been used as a second striker, as a false-9, or even as an out-and-out striker on occasion.

Personal life
Pedro, the grandfather and first coach of Piatti, died in March 2015. Piatti paid tribute to him by lifting his jersey to reveal the message ‘Abuelo te amo’, which translates to 'Grandfather, I love you', on a couple of occasions, most notably at Estadio Azteca after he scored the opener in the first leg of the CONCACAF Champions League Finals.

Honours
San Lorenzo
 Argentine Primera División: 2013 Inicial
 Copa Libertadores: 2014

Montreal Impact
 CONCACAF Champions League runner up: 2014–15
 Canadian Championship: 2019

Individual
 MLS All-Star: 2016, 2017, 2018
 MLS Best XI: 2016, 2018
 Montreal Impact Most Valuable Player: 2015, 2016, 2017, 2018
 Montreal Impact Top Scorer: 2016, 2017, 2018
 Canadian Championship Top Scorer: 2019
 George Gross Memorial Trophy: 2019

References

External links
 
 

1985 births
Living people
Argentine footballers
Argentine expatriate footballers
Association football midfielders
Sportspeople from Córdoba Province, Argentina
Argentine people of Italian descent
AS Saint-Étienne players
Club de Gimnasia y Esgrima La Plata footballers
Club Atlético Independiente footballers
Chacarita Juniors footballers
San Lorenzo de Almagro footballers
U.S. Lecce players
CF Montréal players
Racing Club de Avellaneda footballers
Ligue 1 players
Serie A players
Argentine Primera División players
Major League Soccer players
Major League Soccer All-Stars
Designated Players (MLS)
Argentine expatriate sportspeople in France
Argentine expatriate sportspeople in Italy
Argentine expatriate sportspeople in Canada
Expatriate footballers in France
Expatriate footballers in Italy
Expatriate soccer players in Canada